The Asheville Police Department (APD) is a nationally accredited police department and the primary law enforcement agency servicing a population of 72,789 people within  of the municipality of Asheville, North Carolina.

History
The Asheville Police Department was created in 1849 with a volunteer force of 5 officers and a captain. Later the next year, the town constable became the first chief of police. After several changes to staff and procedures, the force was officially created by ordinance on November 1, 1875. The police commission took over the management of the department in 1909. Aldermen controlled the force until the commission form of government was established in 1915. The police were then placed under control of a Commissioner of Public Safety.

In 1932, the department was using vehicles and had the first radios put into use. The radios at the time were one-way and required the dispatcher to repeat the message for service multiple times, slowly and loudly as there was no way for the beat officer to acknowledge receipt of transmission. By 1934, the police cars were equipped with Thomson .45 caliber submachine guns and riot gas deployment devices. In 1938, the first two-way radios were placed into operation.

Today the department consists of approximately 200 sworn officers.

The Asheville Police Department has been accredited through the Commission on Accreditation for Law Enforcement Agencies (CALEA) since 1994.

From June 2020 to December 2020, APD has seen a rising number in officer resignations and retirements. As of November 17, 53 police officers left the force.

Organization
The Asheville Police department is divided into two Bureaus overseen by Deputy Chiefs, the Administration Bureau and the Operations Bureau. The department is then divided into five divisions: Patrol Operations, Special Services, Administrative Services, Investigations and Operations Support, and Financial Services.

Currently, the department's patrol operations are decentralized into three geographic areas: Adam District (West Asheville), Baker District (North and East Asheville), and Charlie/David District (North and South Asheville). The department also has a variety of specialized units such as: K-9, Emergency Response Unit, Hazardous Devices Team, and Patrol Special Services.

References

External links
 City of Asheville Police Department
Asheville Police Department Facebook

Asheville, North Carolina
Municipal police departments of North Carolina